Leidya is a genus of isopod parasites, that inhabit the waters off China, Mexico, and the Gulf of Mexico. They are in the family Bopyridae, the genus contains the following species:

Leidya bimini  Pearse, 1951
Leidya distorta Leidy, 1855
Leidya infelix Markham, 2002
Leidya ucae Pearse, 1930

References

Isopod genera
Parasites
Cymothoida